Foo Hai Ch'an Monastery, is a Buddhist monastery in Singapore. The foundation was originally set up by Venerable Hong Zong of Taiwan. The present premises are located, adjacent to Sri Sivan Temple, in front of Paya Lebar MRT station, exit C at Geylang East Avenue 2, Singapore.

Overview
Foo Hai Ch'an Monastery was founded in 1935 by Taiwan-born Japan-ordained Venerable Hong Zong who came to popularise Buddhism in Singapore. He was succeeded by Venerable Miao Shou in 1975. The monastery founded the present day Ren Ci Hospital and Medicare Centre at Novena.

Monastery
Built in Zen-style, the Monastery has several structures, statues, Bodhi tree and Buddha relics that are of religious importance and of interest to tourists.

Heng Ha Dharmapala Entrance
The main entrance of the Monastery has two vajra warriors, also known as Generals Heng and Ha. After the Chinese adoption of Buddhism, under the influence of Taoism and folk religions, where even numbers are considered sacred, two larger-than-life Dharmapala protectors, Heng and Ha, made from metal, are traditionally installed on the main entrance of the monastery.

Bell and Drum Towers
Inside the boundary wall from the main entrance are two towers, one each on the north and south corners of the platform housing the main monastery building, a Bell gong tower to the north side and drum tower to the south side.  In the morning, the gong is played 108 times, descending from louder to gentler sound, to announce the end of the night and to awaken from deep unconscious. In the evening, the gong is played 108 times, ascending from gentler to louder sound. The sounds are played to remind listeners of illusions.

Main Monastery Building
The multi-storey main monastery building has a large airy 15 m high prayer hall in the front, which houses a 4-storey high reception, office, administration, auditorium, meeting rooms and toilets at the back. The main hall houses a 3.3 meters statue of Buddha and a 9.9 meter tall statues of Guanyin.

Foo Hai Ch'an Guanyin
Inside the main large prayer hall, there is a 9.9 m (32.5 feet) tall statue of the Thousand-armed manifestation of the  bodhisattva Guanyin, who is the Chinese adaptation of the bodhisattva Avalokitesvara.  There is a large altar in front of the deity, several ornate statues in the roof, and several rows for praying.

Buddha Relic Foo Hai Ch'an Pagoda
A five-story high pagoda, built in 2004 by the Siddhartha centre which donated Sg$6 million to Foo Hai Ch'an in 2004, lies in the central north direction.  Each floor houses decorated  statutes of Buddha in various styles; the top floor houses the sacred Buddha relics.

Guest House and Teaching Centre
Inside the main entrance, to the immediate right side, there is a five-storey above-ground teaching centre, library and guest house building with toilets.

Singapore Bodhi Tree
Singapore Bodhi Tree is a sacred Bodhi Tree,  between the main monastery building and pagoda. It is a gift given to the monastery by the then visiting president of Sri Lanka. It comes from the cutting of Jaya Sri Maha Bodhi tree (planted at Anuradhapura in 288 BC, by king Ashoka's eldest daughter Sangamitta) after taking a sapling cutting from the original UNESCO World Heritage Site Bodhi Tree at Bodh Gaya in India under which Buddha attained the enlightenment.

Foo Hai Ch'an Columbarium
Foo Hai Ch'an Columbarium, housing urns containing ashes of cremated deceased people, lies in the basement under the pagoda and guest house building.

Controversy
Venerable Ming Yi of Foo Hai Ch'an Monastery was imprisoned in a high-profile corruption scandal for misappropriating funds and giving false information in 2010. The Commissioner of Charities suspended him from decision-making positions in Foo Hai Ch'an Monastery and other related organisations.

See also
 Buddhism in Singapore

References

External links

Buddhist organizations
Buddhist charities
Buddhist temples in Singapore
Chinese-Singaporean culture
Geylang
Taiwanese diaspora in Asia
Religious organizations established in 1935